This is a list of Norwegian television related events from 2005.

Events
30 January - TVN joined forces with Kanal5 from Sweden to co-produce the Scandinavian version of Big Brother.
20 May - Jorun Stiansen wins the third series of Idol, becoming the show's first female winner.
22 May - Britt Goodwin wins the first series of the Scandinavian version of Big Brother for Norway.

Debuts
30 January - The Scandinavian version of Big Brother (2005-2006, 2014–present)

Television shows

2000s
Idol (2003-2007, 2011–present)

Ending this year

Births

Deaths

See also
2005 in Norway